Kill Django... Kill First is a 1971 Spaghetti Western directed by Sergio Garrone.

The original Italian title of the film was Uccidi Django... uccidi per primo!!!

Plot
Johnny befriends an old prospector in a small western gold town. Johnny fights the corrupted banker Burton and his gang of killers on behalf of the old prospector to protect his claim.

Cast

References

External links

1971 films
Django films
1971 Western (genre) films
1970s Italian films